White, Smith & Company was a music publishing firm in Boston, Massachusetts. It issued sheet music and published industry journals, notably the monthly Folio.

History

The business began in 1867 as a partnership between Charles A. White, William F. Smith, and J. Frank Perry when it was known as White, Smith, & Perry. White was a composer, the author of over a thousand songs. He was among the earliest songwriters to establish a successful music publishing company. Many of his songs became popular; his first hit was "Put Me in My Little Bed" (1870). The firm owed a portion of its success to sales of White's compositions, but other sheet music published by them was also successful: "Shoo Fly, Don't Bother Me", published in 1869, sold nearly 200,000 copies. In the early 1870s, the firm also published the earliest works of James A. Bland, who would become one of the most popular songwriters of the late 19th century.

Perry left in 1874 to establish his own publishing company, after which White and Smith's firm became known as White, Smith, & Co. The company continued to prosper, in 1882 publishing White's most successful composition, "Marguerite", which would sell over a million copies through the following two decades. By 1890, White, Smith had expanded to nine branch offices and become one of the largest music publishing firms in the country.

When Smith died in June 1891, White bought his interest in the company and made his son, Daniel L. White, his partner. Charles White died in 1897 at which time the company was incorporated under the name of White-Smith Music Publishing Company with Daniel White as president. The founder's grandson, also named Charles A. White, became the company president in August 1919 on the death of Daniel White, his father. According to historian H. E. Johnson, in 1944 the firm "sold its catalogue to Edwin H. Morris & Co. of New York ... but continued in the business of music printing as White, Smith Printing Co. at 40 Winchester Street until 1973."

Journals

The company's journal, The Folio, was first published in September 1869 at an annual subscription price of $1. Dexter Smith was hired to be the first editor; Smith was a Boston poet, lyricist, and critic who also published his own magazine from 1872 to 1877. In addition to poetry, fiction, and news items related to the music industry, each issue of Folio included 16 pages of sheet music. Its chief objective was the promotion of its publisher, and its last issue was printed in October 1895.

White, Smith also published a journal devoted entirely to organ music, The Organist's Quarterly Journal and Review.

See also
 White-Smith Music Publishing Company v. Apollo Company, 1908

Notes

References

External links

 "White, Smith & Company" entry at International Music Score Library Project
Read The Folio:
 Volumes 8–11 (1873–1874)
 Volume 20 (1881)
 Volume 42 (1895) at Hathi Trust
View sheet music:
 "Put me in my little bed" by Charles A. White at the Library of Congress
 "Da, da Gussie dear" by Charles H. Yale at the Library of Congress
 "Kentucky babe" at the New York Public Library
 "Shew Fly! Don't bother me" at the Library of Congress

1874 establishments in Massachusetts
19th century in Boston
20th century in Boston
Music publishing companies of the United States
Companies based in Boston
Defunct mass media in Boston
1973 disestablishments in Massachusetts
Defunct companies based in Massachusetts